Vijay L. Kelkar (born 15 May 1942) is an Indian economist and academic, who is currently the Chairman of the Forum of Federations, Ottawa & India Development Foundation, New Delhi and Chairman of Janwani – a social initiative of the Mahratta Chamber of Commerce, Industries and Agriculture (MCCIA) in Pune. He has been appointed as a trustee of Sri Sathya Sai Central Trust (Puttaparthi, A.P.) on 4 January 2014. He was also the Chairman of the Finance Commission until January 2010.  He was earlier Advisor to the Minister of Finance (2002–2004), and is known for his role in economic reforms in India. Prior to this, he remained Finance Secretary, Government of India 1998–1999, and in 1999 he has been nominated as Executive director of India, Bangladesh, Bhutan and Sri Lanka on the board of the International Monetary Fund (IMF).

Early life
Kelkar, holds B.E., from College of Engineering Pune, India, 1963, M.S., from University of Minnesota, US, 1965 and Ph.D. in economics from University of California Berkeley, US, 1970.

Career
Kelkar has taught at Administrative Staff College of India, Hyderabad, Center for Economic Development and Administration, Kathmandu, Nepal, South Asia Institute, Heidelberg University, Germany and University of California, Berkeley.

He has held various senior-level positions in the Government of India, as well as in international organizations:
 President, Indian Statistical Institute
 Chairman, CSIR-Tech Pvt Ltd (www.csirtech.com)
 Chairman, National Stock Exchange of India Limited
 Chairman, Forum of Federations, Ottawa 
 Chairman, India Development Foundation
 Vice President, Pune International Center
 Chairman, Thirteenth Finance Commission, India
 Chairman, IDFC Private Equity, Mumbai
 Advisor to Minister of Finance, Government of India in the rank of a Minister of State, from August 2002 to September 2004
 Executive Director for India, Sri Lanka, Bangladesh and Bhutan at the International Monetary Fund, Washington, D.C., USA from August 1999 to August 2002
 Finance Secretary, Government of India, 1998–1999
 Chairman, Tariff Commission, Government of India, 1997–1998
 Secretary, Ministry of Petroleum & Natural Gas, Government of India, 1994–1997
 Director & Coordinator, International Trade Division, UNCTAD, Geneva, Switzerland, 1991–1994
 Chairman, Bureau of Industrial Costs & Prices and Secretary to the Government of India, New Delhi, 1987–1991
 Secretary, Economic Advisory Council to the Prime Minister, Government of India, New Delhi, 1985–1988
 Advisor, Economic Policy & Planning, Ministry of Petroleum & Natural Gas, Government of India, New Delhi, 1982–1987
 Economic Advisor, Ministry of Commerce, Govt of India, 1977–1981
 Chairman of the Board of Green Infra Limited

Committees and commissions headed
 Kelkar committee on PPP in India
 Joint Venture (JV) Committee of NCAD (90 seater National Civil Aircraft).
Kelkar Task Force (which recommended GST)

Awards
Kelkar was awarded the 2011 Padma Vibhushan, the second highest civilian award, in January 2011.

Personal life
Vijay Kelkar is married and has a daughter.

References

External links
 Vijay Kelkar Rediff.com
 

Savitribai Phule Pune University alumni
University of Minnesota alumni
University of California, Berkeley alumni
University of California, Berkeley faculty
20th-century Indian economists
Living people
1942 births
Recipients of the Padma Vibhushan in public affairs
Marathi people
Scientists from Maharashtra
21st-century Indian economists